Oziotelphusa is a genus of freshwater crabs in the family Gecarcinucidae. Its members are found in Sri Lanka and southern India (throughout Kerala and Tamil Nadu and in the southern part of Karnataka). The genus was formerly placed within family Parathelphusidae, but now it is accepted that Parathelphusidae is the junior synonym of Gecarcinucidae.

The genus Oziotelphusa contains fifteen species, all of which are included on the IUCN Red List (LC: least concern; VU: vulnerable; EN: endangered; CR: critically endangered; DD: data deficient):

References

Gecarcinucidae
Freshwater crustaceans of Asia
Taxonomy articles created by Polbot